Into the Blue is a collaborative studio album by jazz pianist Jacky Terrasson and flautist Emmanuel Pahud. The album was released on 10 June 2003 via Blue Note label. The album features jazz treatments of 14 classical melodies recorded in the south of France in late summer of 2001.

Reception
Judith Schlesinger in her review for All About Jazz stated, "Into the Blue is a blue ribbon event. Emmanuel Pahud is a classical flutist. Jacky Terrassson is a jazz pianist known for his playful inventiveness. Into the Blue contains beauty and surprise and flashes of wit, which is typical of anything Terrasson does. Organically floating on the third stream, this one will appeal to both classical and jazz fans."

In 2003, the album was nominated for Grammy award as Best Classical Crossover Album.

Personnel
Jacky Terrasson – piano 
Emmanuel Pahud – flute
Ali Jackson – drums
Sean Smith – acoustic bass

References

2003 albums
Blue Note Records albums
Collaborative albums
Jacky Terrasson albums